50 Greatest Hits is three-disc compilation from country music singer Reba McEntire. The album's release was announced in August 2008 on her official website. It was also her last studio album for MCA Records, a label she had been with since 1984, the album features 20 #1 hits and 46 Top 10 singles. It was released on October 28, 2008, in the United States and Canada a week later. 
The album debuted at #67 on the Billboard Top Country Albums chart for the week of November 15, 2008, and it peaked at #41 for the week of February 20, 2010. The album stayed on the chart's for 35 weeks.

Track listing

Disc one

Disc two

Disc three

Charts

References

2008 greatest hits albums
Reba McEntire compilation albums
MCA Records compilation albums